The 2021 Vuelta a Burgos was a men's road cycling stage race that took place from 3 to 7 August 2021 in the Spanish province of Burgos. It was the 43rd edition of the Vuelta a Burgos, and was rated as a 2.Pro event as part of the 2021 UCI Europe Tour and the 2021 UCI ProSeries calendars.

Teams 

UCI WorldTeams

 
 
 
 
 
 
 
 
 
 
 
 
 

UCI ProTeams

Route

Stages

Stage 1 
3 August 2021 – Burgos (Catedral) to Burgos (El Castillo),

Stage 2 
4 August 2021 – Tardajos to Briviesca,

Stage 3 
5 August 2021 – Busto de Bureba to Espinosa de los Monteros,

Stage 4 
6 August 2021 – Roa to Aranda de Duero,

Stage 5 

Classification leadership table 

 On stage 2, Vincenzo Albanese, who was second in the points classification, wore the green jersey, because first-placed Edward Planckaert wore the violet jersey as the leader of the general classification. For the same reason, Johan Jacobs, who was second in the mountains classification, wore the red jersey.
 On stage 3, Johan Jacobs, who remained in second in the mountains classification, continued to wear the red jersey, but first-placed Edward Planckaert now wore the green jersey as the leader of the points classification.
 On stage 4, Edward Planckaert, who was second in the points classification, wore the green jersey, because first-placed Romain Bardet wore the violet jersey as the leader of the general classification. For the same reason, Geoffrey Bouchard, who was second in the mountains classification, wore the red jersey on stages 4 and 5.

Final classification standings

General classification

Points classification

Mountains classification

Young rider classification

Spanish rider classification

Team classification

References

Sources

External links 

2021
Vuelta a Burgos
Vuelta a Burgos
Vuelta a Burgos
Vuelta a Burgos